The 1984 Campeonato Brasileiro Série A was the 28th edition of the Campeonato Brasileiro Série A.

Format

First Stage The 40 clubs were divided in eight groups of five teams each, playing against the other teams of their respective groups twice. The three best placed teams of each group qualified to the Second Stage, while the fourth placed teams of each group competed in a playoff round named Repescagem.

Repescagem The fourth placed teams of each group played a one-legged playoff. The winners qualified to the Second Stage.

Second Stage The 28 qualified clubs (24 from the First Stage  plus four from the Repescagem) were divided in seven groups of four teams each, playing twice against the other group teams. The two best placed teams of each group qualified to the Third Stage.

Third Stage The 14 qualified clubs plus the club with the best average points among the ones eliminated in the Second Stage plus the Série B 1984 champion (Uberlândia) were divided in four groups of four teams each, playing against the other teams of their respective groups twice. The two best placed teams of each group qualified to the Quarterfinals.

Final Stage The Quarterfinals, Semifinals and the Final were played in two legs.

Standings

First stage

Group A

Group B

Group C

Group D

Group E

Group F

Group G

Group H

Repescagem

Treze, Coritiba, Goiás and Joinville qualified to the Second Stage.

Second stage

Group A

Group B

Group C

Group D

Group E

Group F

Group G

Note: Corinthians qualified due to head-to-head results with Santa Cruz

Third stage

Group A

Group B

Group C

Group D

Final stage

Quarterfinals

Semifinals

The Final

Vasco: Roberto Costa; Edevaldo, Ivan, Daniel González and Aírton; Pires, Arturzinho and Mário (Geovani); Mauricinho (Jussiê), Roberto Dinamite and Marquinho. Head coach: Edu.

Fluminense: Paulo Víctor, Aldo, Duílio, Ricardo Gomes and Renato; Jandir, Delei (Renê) and Assis; Romerito, Washington (Wilsinho) and Tato. Head coach: Carlos Alberto Parreira.

Fluminense: Paulo Víctor; Aldo, Duílio, Ricardo Gomes and Branco; Jandir, Delei and Assis; Romerito, Washington and Tato. Head coach: Carlos Alberto Parreira.

Vasco: Roberto Costa; Edevaldo, Ivan, Daniel González and Aírton; Pires, Arturzinho and Mário; Jussiê (Marcelo), Roberto Dinamite and Marquinho. Head coach: Edu.

Final standings

References
Campeonato Brasileiro Série A 1984 at RSSSF

1984
1
Brazil
B